The Grande Prêmio Bento Gonçalves is a Group I is a left-handed flat race for three-year-olds and up in Brazil.

Disputed over (actually) 2,400 meters,  every November at Hipodromo do Cristal.

It is the most traditional horse race in dirt track in Brazil, raced since 1909.

Race Day
November, 15 or approx. ; each year.

Results

References

Horse races in Brazil